Gielen is a Dutch and Low German patronymic surname most common in Belgian and Dutch Limburg. The given name Giel is a short form of either Michiel, Gilbert or Aegidius. Variant forms are Giele and Gielens. Notable people with this name include:

 (1921–2004), Belgian racing cyclist
Johan Gielen (born 1968), Belgian-born Dutch trance artist, DJ, and remixer
Jos Gielen (1898–1981), Dutch politician and literary historian
Michael Gielen (1927–2019), Austrian conductor
 (born 1952), Dutch biophysicist, chairman of the NWO
Giele
 (1929–2002), German handball player and coach
 (1867–1929), Belgian painter and engraver
Janet Zollinger Giele (born 1934), American sociologist
Louis H. Giele (1861–1932), German-born American architect

See also
Geelen, surname of the same origin

References

Dutch-language surnames
Patronymic surnames

de:Gielen